Bejou can refer to a community in the United States:

 Bejou, Minnesota
 Bejou Township, Minnesota